Dur Dasht (also Romanized as Dūr Dasht) is a village in Jalalvand Rural District, Firuzabad District, Kermanshah County, Kermanshah Province, Iran. At the 2006 census, its population was 304, in 57 families.

References 

Populated places in Kermanshah County